Bruno Pradal (17 July 1949 – 19 May 1992) was a French actor.

Filmography

External links 
 

1949 births
1992 deaths
People from Rabat
Road incident deaths in France
French male film actors
French male television actors
French male stage actors
20th-century French male actors